

Summary
The club with a new owner Grupo Zeta replaced Bartolomé Beltrán  and appointed Antonio Asensio as new President

Squad
Squad at end of season

Transfers

Left club during season

Arrived club during season

Competitions

La Liga

League table

Positions by round

Matches

Copa del Rey

Eightfinals

Quarterfinals

Cup Winners' Cup

First round

Before the game, the delegate of Hearts complained about the non-standard goal height, and the referee measured it to be one centimeter lower than regulation. Hearts agreed to play the game anyway.

Second round

Quarter-final

Semi-final

Final

Supercopa de España

Statistics

Players Statistics

See also
RCD Mallorca
1998–99 La Liga
1998–99 Copa del Rey
1998–99 UEFA Cup Winners' Cup

References

RCD Mallorca seasons
Mallorca